Gainsari Junction railway station is located in Gainsari village of Balrampur district, Uttar Pradesh state of India. Its code is GIR. It has two platforms. Passenger and DEMU trains halt here.

References

Lucknow NER railway division
Railway stations in Balrampur district